

Match details

References

External links
Official League Cup Website
 Welsh-Premier.com Loosemores League Cup

Final
April 2010 sports events in the United Kingdom